Swettenham is a village and civil parish in Cheshire, England.

Swettenham may also refer to:

 Frank Swettenham, the first Resident General of the Federated Malay States 
 J. A. Swettenham, government official
 Port Swettenham, the former name of Port Klang, Malaysia
 Swettenham Hall, a country house near village of Swettenham, England
 Swettenham Meadows Nature Reserve